Tessy Thomas  (born April 1963) is an Indian scientist and Director General of Aeronautical Systems and the former Project Director for Agni-IV missile in Defence Research and Development Organisation. She is the first ever woman scientist to head a missile project in India.

Early life
Tessy Thomas was born in April 1963 in Alappuzha, Kerala, She was named after Mother Teresa (Tessy being a derivative of Teresa or Tressia). There is conflicting information on whether her father was an IFS officer or a small-time businessman or an accountant. When Thomas was 13, her father suffered from a stroke which left his right side paralyzed. Her mother who was a teacher, remained a homemaker to look after the family in such dire condition.

She grew up near Thumba Equatorial Rocket Launching Station and says her fascination with rockets and missiles began then. She was stimulated even by the wonderment of aircraft flying.

Thomas has four other sisters and one brother. She has mentioned in interviews about her parents ensuring their children received proper education and encouraging the six siblings to pursue careers of their own interest so that they can excel. Two of her siblings are engineers while another pursued an MBA.

Thomas credited her hometown and mother for her personal development. “I grew up with the pretty backwaters of Kerala as my backyard. I guess nature gives you strength and good thoughts. The power of nature cannot be undermined in one’s development.” Of her mother she has said, “It must have been tough for my mother — who was not allowed to work — to look after us on her own. Yet she made sure each of her five daughters and one son had a good education.... I’ve inherited her strong will for sure. I am equally persevering and determined like my mother.”

Education 
Tessy Thomas studied in St. Michael's Higher Secondary School and St. Joseph's Girl's Higher Secondary School in Alappuzha. She had a natural flair for mathematics and physics. She scored one hundred percent in mathematics during her 11th and 12th years in school. In the same years she had also scored more than ninety five percent in science.

She also received a scholarship that covered her tuition fees having been entered into the first ten students of the merit list during her admissions. The loan gave her the courage to live in a hostel while pursuing her B.Tech.

In both school and college Tessy was involved in extracurricular activities including political issues. She excelled in sports especially badminton bringing much recognition to her alma maters.

She also has an M.Tech in Guided Missile from the Institute of Armament Technology, Pune (now known as the Defence Institute of Advanced Technology). She also pursued MBA in Operations Management and Ph.D. in guidance missile under the Defence Research and Development Organisation.

Career
Thomas joined the Defence Research and Development Organisation in 1988, where she worked on the design and developments of the new generation ballistic missile, Agni. She was appointed by A. P. J. Abdul Kalam for the Agni Project.
In addition, Thomas was the associate project director of the 3,000 km range Agni-III missile project. She was the project director for mission Agni IV which was successfully tested in 2011. Later, Thomas was appointed as the project director of the 5,000 km range Agni-V in 2009, which was successfully tested on 19 April 2012. In 2018, she became the Director-General, Aeronautical Systems of DRDO.

She is a fellow at the Indian National Academy of Engineering (INAE), Institution of Engineers-India (IEI) and Tata Administrative Service (TAS).

Personal life
She is married to Saroj Kumar, a commander in the Indian Navy and they have a son, Tejas.

Awards
Tessy Thomas received the Lal Bahadur Shastri National Award for her contribution for making India self-reliant in the field of missile technology.

She was also the recipient of the Dr Thomas Cangan Leadership Award at the Faculty of Management Studies – Institute of Rural Management, Jaipur (FMS-IRM) in 2018.

Publications

See also

Agni (missile)
Agni-1
Agni-2
Agni-3
Agni-4
Agni-5
DRDO

References

External links
TV News Interview with Tessy Thomas

Engineers from Kerala
Malayali people
Defence Research and Development Organisation
Indian aerospace engineers
Indian Space Research Organisation people
1963 births
Living people
People from Alappuzha district
Indian women engineers
Government Engineering College, Thrissur alumni
20th-century Indian engineers
20th-century Indian women scientists
21st-century Indian engineers
Scientists from Kerala
21st-century Indian women scientists
Women scientists from Kerala
20th-century women engineers
21st-century women engineers